Robert Henry “Pete” Bragg Jr. (August 11, 1919 – October 2, 2017), was a professor in the Department of Materials Science and Engineering in the UC Berkeley College of Engineering.

Education 
Bragg attended Tilden Technical High School and Woodrow Wilson Junior College in Chicago.
Bragg served in the military during World War II, and then used the money allotted to him from the G.I. Bill to attend Illinois Institute of Technology (IIT), and pursue a career in physics.
Bragg earned a BS degree in 1949 and an MS degree in 1951 and subsequently worked for the Dover Electroplating Company and at the Portland Cement Association Research Laboratory.
He earned his PhD in physics from the Illinois Institute of Technology in 1960, and worked for Palo Alto Research Laboratory for the Lockheed Missiles and Space Company from 1960 to 1969.

Career 
In 1969, the University of California at Berkeley hired him as a full professor,
and he also became a principal investigator at the Materials and Molecular Division at Lawrence Berkeley Laboratory.
His research was in the areas of X-ray crystallography, eutectic solidification, and the properties of carbon materials.

While at Berkeley, Bragg served on the policy advisory board of the Black Studies program and managed the Chancellor's Fellowship Program providing opportunities for minority faculty.

Bragg retired from the Berkeley faculty in 1987, after a career that included service as Department Chair from 1978 to 1981. At the time he was one of six black faculty members.

In retirement, Bragg was awarded a Fulbright fellowship to conduct research at the University of Ife in Nigeria in 1992, and developed an exhibit for the Museum of African American Technology in Oakland.
In 1995, Bragg became a fellow of the National Society of Black Physicists.

He was not related to the British Bragg family of scientists.

References

1919 births
2017 deaths
American physicists
African-American scientists
Illinois Institute of Technology alumni
Kennedy–King College alumni
UC Berkeley College of Engineering faculty
People from Jacksonville, Florida
20th-century African-American people
21st-century African-American people
African-American physicists